Rhabdophera arefacta is a species of moth in the family Erebidae first described by Swinhoe in 1884. The species is found in India, Pakistan, Egypt, Israel, Jordan and Iraq.

There are multiple generations per year. Adults are on wing from March to November.

The larvae feed on Prosopis stephaniana.

External links

Image

Ophiusini
Fauna of Mauritania
Moths of the Middle East